Valentin Porcișteanu (born November 25, 1982 in Bucharest, Romania) is a driver in the Romanian Rally Championship, who won the National Champion title in 2011, four National Runner-Up titles in 2010, 2012, 2018, 2019 and Colin McRae Flat Out Trophy in 2013 (ERC Sibiu Rally).

Early career 
Before running in the Romanian National Rallying Championship, Valentin Porcisteanul competed in the Romanian Hill Climb Championship, obtaining two podiums in Abrud Hill Climb 2003 (3rd place, young drivers' classification) and Brasov Hill Climb 2003 (3rd place, Class N1.6).

Romanian National Rally Championship

2003 – 2007 

Valentin Porcisteanu made his debut in the Romanian National Rallying Championship in 2003, his first appearance taking place at Arges Rally, as vorleiter. In his very first year he scored two class podiums in N1.6 Trophy, at the Harghita Rally and Cluj Rally, announcing himself as a strong candidate for the future seasons. Following the 2004 season in which he competed with a Dacia Nova GTI, within Class N1.6, finishing 4th at Brasov Rally, 3rd at Romania Rally and 4th at Harghita Rally, in 2005 he drove a Citroen Saxo VTS, his best event results being Class N1.6 victories at the Maramures Rally and Bucharest Rally. His positive development continued in 2006, when he scored two more Class N1.6 victories at the Sibiu Rally and Tara Barsei Rally. One year later, in 2007, he scored 7 wins in the row, at end of the season being 1st in the general classification of Class N2.

2008 – 2012 

In 2008 Valentin Porcisteanu stepped into the top class of the Romanian National Rallying Championship, competing with a Mitsubishi Lancer Evo VII and finishing 7th in the Overall ranking and 4th in the Mitsubishi Lancer Cup. Porcisteanu started the 2009 season in the best possible way, with a win in Brasov Rally, followed by other outstanding results: two 2nd places in the Tara Barsei Rally and Banat Rally and two 3rd places in Cluj Rally and Arges Rally, securing a 4th place overall in the drivers' national championship. In 2010 he scored a win in Tara Barsei Rally and three second places at Brasov, Sibiu, Arad, finishing second in the Romanian National Rally Championship Ranking. 2011 is the year of the greatest success of his career – he scored wins in Brasov Rally, Cluj Rally, Arad Rally and Tara Barsei Rally, and ended up the season as the youngest ever Champion in the Romanian National Rally Championship history. In the 2012 season he won a second National Runner-up Title, after two victories in TESS Rally and Timis Rally and two podium finishes – 3rd in Transylvania Rally and again 3rd in Sibiu Rally (Intercontinental Rally Challenge).

European Rally Championship 
In 2009 Valentin Porcisteanu participated in two European Rally Championship events, finishing 17th in the Rally Mille Miglia and on the 6th position in Croatia Delta Rally. In the same year he qualified and represented Romania at the final Pirelli Star Driver, a competition initiate to support young rally drivers, organised by Pirelli and the Fédération Internationale de l'Automobile (FIA).

The inclusion of Sibiu Rally in the 2013 European Rally Championship offered Valentin Porcisteanu the chance to participate in another international event along with some prominent personalities of European and World motorsport: Jan Kopecky, Bryan Bouffier, François Delecour, Toshihiro Arai. At the end of the competition he secured the 6th place in the FIA overall ranking, his evolution being also rewarded with the Colin McRae Flat Out Award.

Personal life 
Valentin Porcisteanu lives in Pitesti, Arges County, Romania.

Romanian Rally Championship Podiums

Romanian Rally Championship results

2003

2004

2005

2006

2007

2008

2009

2010

2011

2012

2013

2017

2018

2019

European Rally Championship Results

2009

2013

Intercontinental Rally Challenge Results

2012

External links 
  Website oficial Valentin Porcișteanu
  BCR Leasing Rally Team ia startul in CNR 2012
  CNR Timiș – BCR Leasing Rally Team – La start pentru o noua victorie
  CNR – Valentin Porcișteanu a câștigat Timiș Rally
  CNR Cluj – Obiectivul BCR Leasing Rally Team este victoria
  CNR Sibiu – BCR Leasing Rally Team la primul raliu din IRC
  CNR Țara Bârsei: BCR Leasing RT – Un nou start către câștigarea titlului național
  CNR - BCR Leasing Rally Team abordează strategic Tess Rally
  CNR - BCR Leasing RT a încheiat TESS Rally cu rezultate foarte bune

Romanian rally drivers
1982 births
Living people
European Rally Championship drivers
Sportspeople from Bucharest